Virginia Joanne Torczon is an American applied mathematician and computer scientist known for her research on nonlinear optimization methods including pattern search. She is dean of graduate studies and research, and chancellor professor of computer science, at the College of William & Mary.

Education and career
Torczon majored in history as an undergraduate at Wesleyan University. She earned her Ph.D. in mathematical sciences in 1989 from Rice University. Her dissertation, Multi-Directional Search: a Direct Search Algorithm for Parallel Machines, was supervised by John E. Dennis.

Before becoming dean of graduate studies and research at William & Mary, she was the first female chair of the computer science department there.

Recognition
Torczon's paper "On the Convergence of Pattern Search Algorithms" won the inaugural Society for Industrial and Applied Mathematics (SIAM) Outstanding Paper Prize for the best paper published in a SIAM journal in 1999.

References

External links
Home page

Year of birth missing (living people)
Living people
20th-century American mathematicians
21st-century American mathematicians
American women mathematicians
American computer scientists
American women computer scientists
Wesleyan University alumni
Rice University alumni
College of William & Mary faculty
21st-century American women